The Sunday Hour  was a long-standing show broadcast on the BBC Light Programme and then BBC Radio 2 in the United Kingdom, broadcast for 78 years between 14 July 1940 and 28 January 2018.

For most of its life it occupied a Sunday evening slot, latterly between 8:30 pm and 9:00 pm but in 2013 it moved to a Sunday morning slot between 6:00 am and 7:00 am. It broadcast Christian hymns and prayer, and was one of only two remaining Christian-based shows on Radio 2, the other being Good Morning Sunday.

For its first fifty years, many presenters took part, and the entire show was hosted by a different church each week. From September 1990, the format changed so that the show was presented by a regular presenter from the studio, with recordings of hymns, some sung by a "featured choir", inserted between the discussion, prayers and dedications. Each week the show is centred on a specific theme: an event in the Church calendar, a passage of the Bible, or a more general area such as the family or the importance of carers. The longest-serving of the regular presenters was Roger Royle, an Anglican priest, who presented the show between September 1990 and April 2007. Brian D'Arcy, a Passionist priest from Northern Ireland, took over as the presenter in April 2007. Diane-Louise Jordan was the next presenter, replacing Father Brian in February 2012.  Jordan announced she was leaving in July 2017. The show's final presenter was the Rev. Kate Bottley.

From 20 January 2013, the show was extended to an hour and moved to a new slot from 6:00 am to 7:00 am on Sunday mornings. The programme's name was changed to The Sunday Hour. Singer Michael Ball took over the Sunday evening slot with a new two-hour show.

The show was axed and broadcast its final show on 28 January 2018 after 78 years in favour of a brand new format for Radio 2's Sunday breakfast programme, Good Morning Sunday, starting 4 February.

Presenters

19401990: Various
19902007: Roger Royle
20072012: Brian D'Arcy
20122017: Diane-Louise Jordan
20172018: Kate Bottley

References

External links 

BBC Radio 2 programmes
BBC Light Programme programmes
British religious radio programmes
British music radio programmes
1940 radio programme debuts
2018 radio programme endings